Emily is a city in Crow Wing County, Minnesota, United States. The population was 813 at the 2010 census. It is part of the Brainerd Micropolitan Statistical Area.

Minnesota State Highway 6 and Crow Wing County Road 1 are the main routes in the community.

History
The city of Emily was named for the nearby Emily Lake. It was platted in November 1905. It was incorporated in March 1957. The post office at Emily began in 1900.

Geography
Emily is in northeastern Crow Wing County.

Demographics

2010 census
As of the census of 2010, there were 813 people, 368 households, and 237 families living in the city. The racial makeup of the city was 97.4% White, 0.2% African American, 0.2% Native American, 0.1% from other races, and 2.0% from two or more races. Hispanic or Latino of any race were 0.9% of the population.

There were 368 households, of which 18.5% had children under the age of 18 living with them, 54.6% were married couples living together, 4.9% had a female householder with no husband present, 4.9% had a male householder with no wife present, and 35.6% were non-families. 31.0% of all households were made up of individuals, and 14.9% had someone living alone who was 65 years of age or older. The average household size was 2.21 and the average family size was 2.73.

The median age in the city was 52.8 years. 18.3% of residents were under the age of 18; 5% were between the ages of 18 and 24; 15.4% were from 25 to 44; 31.2% were from 45 to 64; and 30.1% were 65 years of age or older. The gender makeup of the city was 50.4% male and 49.6% female.

2000 census
As of the census of 2000, there were 847 people, 368 households, and 243 families living in the city. The racial makeup of the city was 97.87% White, 0.24% African American, 0.94% Native American, 0.24% Asian, and 0.71% from two or more races. Hispanic or Latino of any race were 0.71% of the population.

There were 368 households, out of which 21.7% had children under the age of 18 living with them, 58.4% were married couples living together, 4.3% had a female householder with no husband present, and 33.7% were non-families. 30.7% of all households were made up of individuals, and 17.4% had someone living alone who was 65 years of age or older.  The average household size was 2.30 and the average family size was 2.85.

In the city, the population was spread out, with 22.4% under the age of 18, 4.8% from 18 to 24, 19.1% from 25 to 44, 29.0% from 45 to 64, and 24.6% who were 65 years of age or older.  The median age was 48 years. For every 100 females, there were 102.6 males.  For every 100 females age 18 and over, there were 99.1 males.

The median income for a household in the city was $34,276, and the median income for a family was $37,750. Males had a median income of $30,000 versus $23,068 for females. The per capita income for the city was $17,854.  About 3.9% of families and 7.7% of the population were below the poverty line, including 9.9% of those under age 18 and 9.5% of those age 65 or over.

References

External links
Emily, MN – City Website
Emily–Fifty Lakes Chamber of Commerce – Visitor Information

Cities in Minnesota
Cities in Crow Wing County, Minnesota
Brainerd, Minnesota micropolitan area